Avoir 20 ans dans les Aurès (English: To Be Twenty in the Aures) is a 1972 film.

Synopsis 
A group of young pacifists from Brittany is taken to a camp destined to deserters. They end up by accepting the increasing violence with which they are trained, and become true killing machines. In April, 1961, they are moved to the Aurès mountains in Algeria where they face off against troops from the National Liberation Army. During the battle, the battalion captures a rebel fighter which they shall execute the next morning. Their most precious ideals are supposed to become overridden by sheer discipline.

Cast 
 Philippe Léotard as Lieutenant Perrin  
 Alexandre Arcady as Noël  
 Hamid Djellouli as Youssef  
 Jacques Canselier as Coco   
 Jean-Michel Ribes as Le curé  
 Alain Scoff as Lomic, the soldier
 Jean-Jacques Moreau as Jacques  
 Michel Elias as Robert, the teacher
 Yves Branellec as Youenn
 Philippe Brizard as La Marie 
 Charles Trétout as Charles 
 Pierre Vautier as Pierrick
 Alain Vautier as Lanick
 Bernard Ramel as Nanard

Prizes
Cannes Film Festival, 1972.

References

External links
 

1972 films
French war drama films
1970s French-language films
Films set in the French colonial empire
Films directed by René Vautier
1970s French films